Calyciphora is a genus of moths in the family Pterophoridae.

Species
Calyciphora acarnella (Walsingham, 1898)
Calyciphora adamas (Constant, 1895)
Calyciphora albodactylus (Fabricius, 1794)
Calyciphora golestanica Alipanah & Ustjuzhanin, 2005
Calyciphora homoiodactyla (Kasy, 1960)
Calyciphora marashella Zagulajev, 1986
Calyciphora nephelodactyla (Eversmann, 1844)
Calyciphora xanthodactyla (Treitschke, 1833)

References 

Pterophorini
Moth genera